Rosemont is an unincorporated community located within Delaware Township in Hunterdon County, in the U.S. state of New Jersey. Its ZIP code is 08556. Located at the top of a small hill, the center of the community is located along Kingwood Stockton Road (County Route 519) near its intersections with Raven Rock Rosemont Road and Rosemont Ringoes Road (CR 604). Farmland (for which it is listed on the National Register of Historic Places) and residences make up the surrounding area while the center of the settlement includes residences, a post office, and an antique shop.

Notable people

People who were born in, residents of, or otherwise closely associated with Rosemont include:
 Willard H. Allen (1893–1957), poultry scientist who served as New Jersey secretary of agriculture from 1938 to 1956.
 George Newton Best (1846–1926), bryologist, expert on moss taxonomy and second president of the Sullivant Moss Society.

References

Delaware Township, Hunterdon County, New Jersey
Unincorporated communities in Hunterdon County, New Jersey
Unincorporated communities in New Jersey
National Register of Historic Places in Hunterdon County, New Jersey